Flavignerot is a commune in the Côte-d'Or department in eastern France.

History
In antiquity, Flavignerot was originally an ancient Gallo-Roman settlement under its Latin name, Flaviniacum. Its nearby summit Mont Afrique was a camp site called Camp de Cesar, where the Roman senator Julius Caesar never set foot on the peak.

In 1979, the Carmel of Dijon monastery was relocated from Dijon to a hill near Flavignerot.

Population

See also
Communes of the Côte-d'Or department

References

Communes of Côte-d'Or